Vocon is an architecture and interior design firm with offices in Cleveland, New York and Los Angeles. Founded in 1987, the firm is led by siblings Debbie Donley and Paul Voinovich.

History
Established in 1987 with offices in Cleveland, New York and Los Angeles, Vocon creates distinctive, productive environments for private- and public-sector clients across the globe through the delivery of full-scale architectural project capabilities including architecture, interior design, workplace strategy and experiential brand design. Licensed in all 50 states, Vocon is one of the largest design firms in the country and is currently ranked as the 41st largest design firm globally by Interior Design Magazine.

Notable works

Cleveland Browns Facility
Cleveland Institute of Art, residence hall source
Compass headquarters
Goodyear Tire & Rubber Company's global headquarters
Key Tower plaza
Oatey Co. headquarters
Saucy Brew Works
Sterling Jewelers Ghent Road headquarters
Mercedes-Benz of Burlington 
Zashin & Rich office, Ernst & Young Tower

See also
Interior design
Retail design

References

Companies based in Ohio
1987 establishments in Ohio
Companies established in 1987
Architecture firms based in Ohio